Amesia is a genus of moths belonging to the family Zygaenidae.

The species of this genus are found in Southeastern Asia.

Species
Species:
Amesia aliris 
Amesia namouna 
Amesia sanguiflua

References

Zygaenidae
Zygaenidae genera